Bhattacharya, Bhattacharyya, and Bhattacharjee are three common spellings of a Bengali Brahmin and  surname. In Bengal, Bhattacharjees, together with Banerjees, Chatterjees, Gangulys and Mukherjees, form the Kulin Brahmins.

Notable persons with this surname 
A. Bhattacharya, Indian statistician who worked at the Indian Statistical Institute in the 1930s and early 40s
Abhi Bhattacharya (1921−1993), Indian actor of Hindi and Bengali cinema
Abhijeet Bhattacharya (born 1958), Indian playback singer and composer
Abhinash Bhattacharya, leader in revolutionary movement for Indian independence
Aditya Bhattacharya (born 1965), Indian film director and screenwriter, Raakh
Amitabha Bhattacharya, Indian professor at the Indian Institute of Technology Kharagpur and an author of digital communication
Amitabh Bhattacharya, Indian lyricist and playback singer who works in Bollywood 
Anirban Bhattacharya, Indian actor
Anuradha Bhattacharyya (born 1975), Indian writer
Arindam Bhattacharya, Indian politician, Member of West Bengal Legislative Assembly and President, West Bengal Youth Congress
Arindam Bhattacharya, Indian footballer
Arundhati Bhattacharya, Indian banker (former Chairman, State Bank of India)
Asoke Kumar Bhattacharyya (1919−2016), Indian archaeologist
Atanu Bhattacharya, Indian football goalkeeper coach
B. B. Bhattacharya, Indian economist and educationist
Basu Bhattacharya (1934−1997), Indian film director (Bollywood)
Bhabani Bhattacharya (1906-1988), Indian writer, Indo-English literature
Bibhu Bhattacharya (1944−2011), Indian male actor in Bengali cinema
Bidhayak Bhattacharya (1907−1986), Indian playwright, litterateur and journalist
Bijon Bhattacharya (1917−1978), Indian theatre and film personality
Bikash Bhattacharya, Indian politician
Birendra Kumar Bhattacharya (1924−1997), Indian novelist and modern Assamese littérateur
Biswajit Bhattacharya, Indian footballer, manager, and head coach on many prominent Indian domestic league teams
Buddhadeb Bhattacharjee (born 1944), Indian politician, member of the politburo of the Communist Party of India, Chief Minister of West Bengal (2000–2011)
Chandril Bhattacharya, Indian singer
Charu Chandra Bhattacharya (1883−1961), prominent Indian science teacher and writer of various scientific articles mainly for children in Bangla
Chitra Bhattacharya (1926-2010), Bangladeshi politician from the Awami League and member of parliament
Chittaprosad Bhattacharya, Indian political artist of the mid-20th century
Debashish Bhattacharya (born 1963), Indian classical musician who plays the lap slide guitar
Debapriya Bhattacharya, Bangladeshi economist and public policy analyst
Deben Bhattacharya (1921−2001), Indian radio producer, record producer, ethnomusicologist, anthropologist, documentary filmmaker, photographer
Debesh Bhattacharya (1914-2004), Bangladeshi jurist and judge (Appellate level of the Bangladesh Supreme Court)
Devoleena Bhattacharjee, Indian television actress
Dhananjay Bhattacharya, Indian singer (son of Surendranath Bhattacharya)
Dipankar Bhattacharya, Indian politician
Durga Mohan Bhattacharyya, Indian scholar and professor of Sanskrit.
Ganga Kishore Bhattacharya (died 1831), Indian journalist, teacher and reformer
Gautam Bhattacharya, Indian sports journalist, sports editor of the Ananda Bazar Patrika
Gopal Chandra Bhattacharya (1895−1981), Indian entomologist and naturalist
Haridas Bhattacharya (1891−1956), Indian philosopher and educationist
Hiren Bhattacharyya (1932-2012), Indian Assamese language poet 
Jaya Bhattacharya, Indian television actress
Jogendra Nath Bhattacharya, Indian pandit and one of a group of Hindu nationalists who held a benevolent view of the traditional role of caste in Indian society
Kamalakanta Bhattacharya (1769–1821), Indian poet of the late 18th century
Kanailal Bhattacharya, Indian educationist, former minister of Commerce and Indrustries and food department, West Bengal
Kanailal Bhattacharya, Indian nationalist
Kankan Bhattacharyya, Indian scientist prominent for work on modern non-linear laser spectroscopy
Kedarnath Bhattacharya, Indian municipal leader, first elected vice-chairman of Howrah Municipal Corporation
Kumar Sanu/Kedarnath Bhattacharya (born 1957), Indian playback singer
Krishna Chandra Bhattacharya (1875−1949), Indian philosopher (Calcutta University)
Kumar Bhattacharyya, Baron Bhattacharyya, CBE (1940−2019), British Indian engineer, educator and government advisor
Lilabati Bhattacharjee, Indian mineralogist and former Director (Mineral Physics), Geological Survey of India
Lokenath Bhattacharya (1927−2001), prolific Indo-French writer and philosopher
Madhuri Bhattacharya, Indian actress and former model who has appeared in Kannada and Bollywood films
Mahesh Chandra Nyayratna Bhattacharyya CIE (1836−1906), Indian scholar of Sanskrit, principal of the Sanskrit College for over 18 years
Monoranjan Bhattacharya, Indian football international player and a club level coach and manager
Nabarun Bhattacharya (1948−2014), Indian writer
Nagendra Kumar Bhattacharyya (1888−1967), Indian politician, Commissioner of the Berhampore Municipality from 1932 to 1948
Nalinidhar Bhattacharya (1921−2016), Indian Assamese language poet and literary critic 
Narendra Nath Bhattacharyya (1887−1954), Indian revolutionary, radical activist and political theorist, known as M. N. Roy
Nirmalendu Bhattacharya (died 2020), Indian politician
Nivedita Bhattacharya, Indian actress
P. C. Bhattacharya, Indian central banker, seventh Governor of the Reserve Bank of India from 1 March 1962 to 30 June 1967
Panchanan Bhattacharya (1853−1919), Indian yogi and chief disciple of Yogiraj Sri Shama Churun Lahiri Mahasaya
Pannalal Bhattacharya, Indian singer
Rinki Bhattacharya (born 1942), Indian writer, columnist and documentary filmmaker
Ritwik Bhattacharya, Indian squash player
Sameer Bhattacharya, Indian American guitarist for Texas rock band Flyleaf
Sanjiv Bhattacharya, British Indian journalist based in the US
Santosh Bhattacharyya (1924−2011), Indian scholar, Vice-Chancellor of the University of Calcutta
Santosh Chandra Bhattacharyya, Bangladeshi professor at Dhaka University and an intellectual martyr in the Bangladesh Liberation War
Sharmila Bhattacharya, Indian American head of the Biomodel Performance and Behavior laboratory at NASA Ames Research Center
Shoumo Bhattacharya, Indian medical doctor and academic
Siva Brata Bhattacherjee (1921−2003), Indian Professor of physics and crystallographer, University of Calcutta
Soumya Bhattacharya (born 1969), Indian journalist and author
Subrata Bhattacharya, Indian football Defender who played for India in the 1984 Asian Cup
Suchitra Bhattacharya (1950−2015), Indian novelist
Sukanta Bhattacharya (1926−1947), Indian language poet and playwright
Suma Bhattacharya, Indian model and film actress
Sushil Bhattacharya (1924 - 2015), Indian footballer and veteran coach, first official coach of East Bengal Club, Indian Women's Football Team and Bengal Women's Football Team
Tanmoy Bhattacharya, Indian politician
Tarun Bhattacharya, Indian classical musician who plays the santoor, a type of hammered dulcimer
Utpal Bhattacharya, Indian American finance professor at the Indiana University Kelley School of Business
Vidyadhar Bhattacharya, Indian architect, chief city planner of Jaipur
Shishir Bhattacharja, Bangladeshi linguist and writer

References

Brahmin communities of West Bengal
Bengali Hindu surnames
Kulin Brahmin surnames
Brahmin communities
Brahmin communities by language
Assamese-language surnames